Achladia is the archaeological site of an ancient Minoan villa on eastern Crete.

Geography
The ancient Minoan excavation site is 3 kilometers northeast of the Achladia village, south of Sitia.  From the hill on which the houses stand, there is a view of the valley which drains into the Bay of Sitia, as well as the shoreline of the Ornon Mountains' northeast spur.

Archaeology
Achladia was first excavated in 1939 by Nicolas Platon.  He conducted subsequent excavations here in 1952 and 1959.

The site is a large building with an area of 270 square meters referred to as House A and a smaller building nearby called House B.  Two other Minoan buildings were also found nearby, but were only partially excavated.  House A overlooks the entire bay of Siteia.

There is some dispute about the period of use - Nicolas Platon believed that it was built during MMIII, but Lefteris Platon believes there is enough evidence to support the presence of a light well and polythyra (pier-and-door partition), both Late Minoan architectural features.  If this is true, then the building would have been constructed during LMIB.  Nearby are a LMIIIB tholos tomb at Platyskinos and a LMIII potter's kiln, which may add further contextual evidence for the site's Late Minoan chronology.

Finds excavated from Achladia are at the Heraklion Archaeological Museum and Archaeological Museum of Sitia.

House A
House A consists of 12 excavated ground-floor rooms, and there is no evidence of an upper floor.  Of particular note at the site are the pier-and-door partition connecting Rooms Beta and Gamma, a quern-stone in the kitchen (Room Delta) and a stone slab box in Room Gamma containing an agrimi rhyton.

Evidence indicates that the Achladia buildings were destroyed in a violent earthquake.

References
 Swindale, Ian http://www.minoancrete.com/achladia.htm Retrieved 2 February 2006
 Myers, J.W., Myers, E.E. and Cadogan, G. "Achladia" The Aerial Atlas of Ancient Crete

External links
 http://www.minoancrete.com/achladia.htm

Minoan sites in Crete
Ancient houses in Greece
Populated places in Lasithi